Meydan Chay Rural District is in the Central District of Tabriz County, East Azerbaijan province, Iran. At the National Census of 2006, its population was 51,733 in 13,066 households. There were 56,199 inhabitants in 16,365 households at the following census of 2011. At the most recent census of 2016, the population of the rural district was 56,677 in 17,411 households. The largest of its 23 villages was Kond Rud, with 8,518 people.

References 

Tabriz County

Rural Districts of East Azerbaijan Province

Populated places in East Azerbaijan Province

Populated places in Tabriz County